Barleben is a municipality in the Börde district in Saxony-Anhalt, Germany. It is situated approximately 8 km north of Magdeburg.

Twin towns — sister cities

Barleben is twinned with:
 Viimsi Parish, Estonia

References

Börde (district)